Tim Henman was the defending champion, but lost in the final to Karol Kučera 6–4, 7–6(12–10), 4–6, 4–6, 7–6(7–2).

Seeds
A champion seed is indicated in bold text while text in italics indicates the round in which that seed was eliminated.

Draw

Finals

Top half

Bottom half

References

External links
Draw

1999 ATP Tour
1999 Davidoff Swiss Indoors